Dioryctria okui is a species of snout moth in the genus Dioryctria. It was described by Akira Mutuura in 1958 and is known from Japan.

The larvae feed on the foliage of spruce.

References

Moths described in 1958
okui
Moths of Japan